Cheyenne Parker may refer to:
 Cheyenne Parker (basketball)
 Cheyenne Parker (model)